Lord Dingwall is a title in the Peerage of Scotland. It was created in 1584 for Andrew Keith, and in 1609 for Sir Richard Preston, with remainder to his heirs whatsoever.  In 1619 he was further honoured when he was made Baron Dunmore and Earl of Desmond in the Peerage of Ireland, with remainder to heirs male.  On his death in 1628 the Irish titles became extinct while he was succeeded in the Scottish lordship by his daughter Elizabeth, the second Lady Dingwall.  She was the wife of James Butler, 1st Duke of Ormonde.  Their eldest son Thomas Butler, Earl of Ossory, was summoned by writ to the English Parliament as Baron Butler, of Moore Park, in 1666.  However, he predeceased his parents who were both succeeded by their grandson, the second Duke and third Lord Dingwall. He had already succeeded his father as second Baron Butler.  However, the Duke was attainted in 1715 and his titles forfeited. In 1871, Francis Cowper, 7th Earl Cowper, managed to obtain a reversal of the attainder of the lordship of Dingwall and barony of Butler and became the fourth Lord Dingwall and third Baron Butler.  He was the great-great-great-grandson of Henrietta d'Auverquerque, Countess of Grantham (wife of Henry de Nassau d'Auverquerque, 1st Earl of Grantham), second daughter of Thomas Butler, Earl of Ossory and 1st Baron Butler, whose second daughter Lady Henrietta de Nassau d'Auverquerque married William Clavering-Cowper, 2nd Earl Cowper.  In 1880 he also succeeded his mother as eighth Baron Lucas of Crudwell.  For later history of the lordship of Dingwall and barony of Butler, see the Baron Lucas of Crudwell.

Lord Dingwall (1584)
Andrew Keith, Lord Dingwall

Lords Dingwall (1609)
Richard Preston, 1st Earl of Desmond, 1st Lord Dingwall (d. 1628)
Elizabeth Preston, Duchess of Ormonde, 2nd Lady Dingwall (1615–1684)
James Butler, 2nd Duke of Ormonde, 3rd Lord Dingwall (1665–1745) (attainted 1715)
Heirs but for the attainder:
Lady Elizabeth Butler (d. 1750)
Charles Butler, 1st Earl of Arran (1671-1758)
Lady Frances Elliot (d. 1772)
George Nassau Clavering-Cowper, 3rd Earl Cowper (1738-1789)
George Augustus Clavering-Cowper, 4th Earl Cowper (1776–1799)
Peter Leopold Louis Francis Nassau Clavering-Cowper, 5th Earl Cowper (1778–1837)
George Augustus Frederick Cowper, 6th Earl Cowper (1806–1856)
Francis Thomas de Grey Cowper, 7th Earl Cowper, 4th Lord Dingwall (1834–1905) (restored 1871)
For further holders see Baron Lucas of Crudwell

See also
Earl of Desmond (1619 creation)
Duke of Ormonde
Baron Butler

References
 https://web.archive.org/web/20120331185943/http://www.cracroftspeerage.co.uk/online/content/Dingwall1609.htm

Lordships of Parliament
Extinct lordships of Parliament
Noble titles created in 1584
1609 establishments in Scotland
Noble titles created in 1609